Åheim is a village in Vanylven Municipality in Møre og Romsdal county, Norway.  The village is located along the shore of the inner part of the Vanylvsfjorden.  The village is one of the larger urban areas in the municipality, mostly due to the local olivine mining operations.  The Åheimselva river runs through the village from the lake Gusdalsvatnet to the fjord.  The historic Saint Jetmund Church is located near the mouth of the river in Åheim.  There is also a school in Åheim that serves the students from this part of the municipality.

References

Villages in Møre og Romsdal
Vanylven